{{Infobox song
| name       = Flawed
| cover      = Delta-Goodrem-Flawed-384284-991.jpg
| alt        =
| type       = single
| artist     = Delta Goodrem
| album      = Innocent Eyes (Japan)
| released   = 11 October 2006
| recorded   = 2006
| studio     =
| genre      = Pop
| length     = 4:21
| label      = Sony Music Japan
| writer     = 
| producer   =
| prev_title = Together We Are One
| prev_year  = 2006
| next_title = In This Life
| next_year  = 2007
| misc       = 
}}
"Flawed" is a song written by Billymann, Delta Goodrem and Christopher Rojas, performed by Delta Goodrem. The song was the first song that Goodrem released in Japan and is taken from the Japanese version of her album Innocent Eyes. It is also featured in the Japanese film Adiantum Blue''. In January 2008, "Flawed" re-entered the digital download charts at number 45.

Charts

2006 singles
Delta Goodrem songs
Songs written by Billy Mann
Songs written by Delta Goodrem
Pop ballads
Songs written by Christopher Rojas
2006 songs